Khaled Abdel Razik (born 1975) is an Egyptian chess player.

Career

Razik has represented Egypt at multiple Chess Olympiads, including 2008, 2010 and 2012.

He qualified for the Chess World Cup 2009, where he was defeated by Alexander Morozevich in the first round.

References

External links
 
Khaled Abdel Razik chess-games at 365Chess.com

1975 births
Living people
Egyptian chess players
Chess Olympiad competitors